Stephen M. Reasoner (May 7, 1944 – August 14, 2004) was a United States district judge of the United States District Court for the Eastern District of Arkansas.

Education and career
Born in Houston, Texas, Reasoner received a Bachelor of Arts degree from University of Arkansas in 1966. He received a Juris Doctor from University of Arkansas School of Law in 1969.

He was in the United States Army Reserve from 1969 to 1973 where he was in the 218th Military Intelligence Detachment and became a specialist 4th class. He was in private practice of law in Jonesboro, Arkansas from 1969 to 1988.

Federal judicial service

Reasoner was nominated by President Ronald Reagan on December 19, 1987, to a seat on the United States District Court for the Eastern District of Arkansas vacated by Judge William Overton. He was confirmed by the United States Senate on February 25, 1988, and received commission on February 26, 1988. He served as Chief Judge from 1991 to 1998. He assumed senior status on September 17, 2002 due to a certified disability. 

His service was terminated on August 14, 2004, due to his death in Little Rock, Arkansas.

References

Sources
 

1944 births
2004 deaths
Judges of the United States District Court for the Eastern District of Arkansas
United States district court judges appointed by Ronald Reagan
20th-century American judges
United States Army soldiers
University of Arkansas School of Law alumni
People from Houston
United States Army reservists